Frauenwinkel is a mire landscape in Switzerland, situated at the Seedamm area on Zürichsee lakeshore in the municipality of Freienbach in the Canton of Schwyz.

Geography 
Frauenwinkel is situated on the Seedamm area in Hurden, a locality of Freienbach in the canton of Schwyz. It is bordered by the Zürichsee to the west, by the locality of Pfäffikon to the south and by the Hurden canal to the north; to its east the Obersee (upper lake Zürich) at Rapperswil is situated, as well as the Holzbrücke Rapperswil-Hurden being another protected area. The lake area of about  towards the Lützelau and Ufenau islands is also part of the Frauenwinkel protected area. At Hurden local agricultural use is allowed. The open landscape of Frauenwinkel is the last great unspoilt section of the shore on Zürichsee. Its shallow water areas are southernly and easterly surrounded by marshes and to the northwest by the islands of Ufenau and Lützelau.

The name Frauenwinkel origins from a donation in 965 AD by the emperor Otto I to the pin Unserer lieben Frau (Our Lady) to the Einsiedeln Abbey which still is the owner of the area.

Flora and fauna 
A reed belt lines the greater part of the shore between Pfäffikon and Hurden. Landward there is reed vegetation with large and small sedge flora, rushes, Iris sibirica and Gentiana pneumonanthe. In certain places even transition and high marsh occurs. In the nature reserve there are European rarities, among them Phengaris alcon, Eurasian curlew and Gentiana pneumonanthe, as well as Ruspolia nitidula, a small snail.

Breeding sites 
Frauenwinkel is an important water bird roost and breeding grounds of various rare reed birds. Here the Curlew has one of the last breeding places in Switzerland. On the passage in late February and early March, however, up to 200-strong Numenius arquata flocks may be observed, as well as Emberiza schoeniclus and Acrocephalus arundinaceus'''.

 Endangering  
Strong recovery pressure, nutrient input, excavated material from drainage ditches and (especially in this deep geographical location) the propagation of rampant foreign plants endanger the sensitive area. The splitting of the different areas within the larger habitat area is a threat to the birds living there. In recent decades, commercial and residential buildings, intensified agriculture and leisure claims have gradually reduced the area, a remnant of nature in the laundry room: this is the charm and the great danger.

In addition to the safeguarding of sites by own land acquisitions and the completion of contracts, the broad-based Frauenwinkel foundation, supported by the environmental organizations Ala, SKV, WWF, ZSL and Pro Natura Schwyz, the municipality Freienbach, farmers and industry forces the protection and enhancement of the area by public relation works. In co-operation with the cantonal office of the nature reserve (German: Fachstelle Naturschutz des Kantons Schwyz) the protection status may be optimized.

 Legal protection 
Frauenwinkel is the most important nature reserve on the Zürichsee lakeshore. Established in 1927 and protected in 1980 respectively 1996, the Frauenwinkel bog landscape and lake zone including the Lützelau and Ufenau islands belong to Switzerland's most valuable riparian landscapes. Frauenwinkel ist part of the mire landscapes in Switzerland, bogs and wetlands being in the Inventory of Mire Landscapes of Particular Beauty and National Importance in Switzerland. The area is a moorland and fen site of national importance, according to the Cantonal Protection Ordinance (German: Moorlandschaft und Flachmoorobjekte von nationaler Bedeutung, Kantonale Schutzverordnung).

The protected site is also part of the archaeological Seedamm area including the remains of the Prehistoric wooden bridges respectively Prehistoric pile dwellings around Zürichsee settlements, situated at the Seedamm isthmus between the Zürichsee and the Obersee lake area: Freienbach–Hurden Rosshorn, Freienbach–Hurden Seefeld, Seegubel and Rapperswil-Jona–Technikum. As well as being part of the 56 Swiss sites of the UNESCO World Heritage Site Prehistoric pile dwellings around the Alps, the settlements are also listed in the Swiss inventory of cultural property of national and regional significance as a Class object.

 Literature 
 Pfahlbaufieber. Von Antiquaren, Pfahlbaufischern, Altertümerhändlern und Pfahlbaumythen. Mitteilungen der Antiquarischen Gesellschaft in Zürich'', volume 71. Chronos, Zürich 2004, .

References

External links 

 Website of the Frauenwinkel foundation 

Wetlands of Switzerland
Freienbach
1927 establishments in Switzerland
Lake Zurich
Protected areas of Switzerland
Important Bird Areas of Switzerland
Protected areas established in 1927